Bones is a 2001 American supernatural horror film directed by Ernest Dickerson and starring rapper Snoop Dogg as the eponymous Jimmy Bones, a murdered numbers runner that rises from the grave to avenge his death. The film is presented as a homage to blaxploitation films of the 1970s and incorporates numerous elements from the genre.

It initially met with negative reviews and a dismal box-office performance, but has since been reappraised as a cult classic, especially for Snoop Dogg and Pam Grier's performances, the practical effects, and Dickerson's direction.

Plot
In 1979, Jimmy Bones (Snoop Dogg) is a numbers runner who is loved in his neighborhood as its member and protector. He is betrayed and brutally murdered by corrupt cop Lupovich (Michael T. Weiss) and drug pusher Eddie Mack (Ricky Harris) who then force Jimmy's associates Jeremiah (Clifton Powell) and Shotgun (Ronald Selmour) to take turns stabbing him to death. His lover Pearl (Pam Grier), had been the only one to refuse, trying to kill herself instead but was stopped. Afterward, Bones' elegant brownstone building becomes his own tomb and is closed.

Twenty-two years later, the neighborhood has become rundown because Bones' absence cleared the way for drugs to enter the neighborhood. Four teens, Patrick (Khalil Kain), his brother Bill (Merwin Mondesir), their step-sister Tia (Katharine Isabelle) and their best friend Maurice (Sean Amsing), buy the Bones house to turn it into a nightclub. In the process, Tia finds a black dog who is actually the spiritual manifestation of Jimmy's spirit. As the dog eats, Jimmy is slowly resurrected.

Patrick meets Pearl, who remains in the neighborhood, and her daughter Cynthia (Bianca Lawson), whom he begins courting. Exploring the basement, Patrick, Cynthia, Bill, Tia, and Maurice find Jimmy Bones' remains and realize he was actually murdered. The five decide to keep quiet about the murder and bury the remains. Jeremiah, father to Patrick and Bill and Tia's stepfather, finds out about their plan to open the club at Bones' old building. He freaks out and demands that Patrick and the others leave the building. Patrick, Bill, and Tia refuse his request and open the nightclub, in spite of their father's objections. On opening night, Maurice is lured into an upstairs room and mauled to death by the black dog.

Once he is fully resurrected, Jimmy sets the club on fire, scaring off the club goers, and begins his revenge. Shotgun, who is Pearl's neighbor, tells her how they should have burned the building down a long time ago. After the incident, Pearl admits to Cynthia that Jimmy Bones is her father, as she had a relationship with him. Jimmy first confronts Shotgun and mercy kills him (Shotgun has always felt guilty of Bones' death and became an alcoholic). Patrick confronts his father and demands to know if he helped murder Jimmy Bones twenty-two years earlier. Jeremiah admits to betraying Bones to make money and leave the neighborhood. Also, he got fed up living in Bones' shadow. Jeremiah allowed drugs into the neighborhood as long as he got paid for it.

Later, Jimmy confronts Eddie Mack in his home and decapitates him, keeping the head alive and containing his soul. He does the same to Lupovich. Pearl, knowing that Jeremiah is next, goes with Cynthia to his house to rescue him. They end up being too late. Pearl, Cynthia, Patrick, Bill, Tia and Jeremiah's wife Nancy (Lynda Boyd) watch him get dragged off by Jimmy, leaving nothing but a melted hole in the window. Jimmy brings Jeremiah back to his old house, along with the heads of Lupovich and Mack. Jimmy sends Lupovich and Mack to hell for all eternity while Jeremiah begs for his life.

Patrick, Cynthia, Bill, and Pearl go underground to find that Jimmy Bones' body has disappeared. Pearl tells them that in order to put Jimmy to rest, they have to destroy the dress she wore the night Jimmy was murdered which was buried alongside him, as his blood which splattered onto it still contains his spirit and is the only thing keeping him anchored to the world of the living. As they look for Jimmy, Pearl steps in the elevator which closes and goes up. Meanwhile, Jeremiah asks Jimmy what he wants. He asks Jeremiah if he could give him his life back. When Jeremiah says he can't do that, Jimmy sends him to hell.

Pearl gets off the elevator and walks into a room that is filled with ignited candles. She has a flashback and Jimmy appears and puts the bloody dress on her. Patrick, Cynthia, and Bill head to the second floor where they see a ghostly Maurice, who leads Bill in the wrong direction where he is captured and killed. Patrick tries to reach him but is too late. Patrick and Cynthia make their way to the room where Pearl and Jimmy are at; Patrick knows it is a trap. As Cynthia is lured to Pearl and Jimmy, Patrick hears his father's voice in a mirror begging for help. When Patrick hesitates, Jeremiah chokes him. Patrick uses his knife to chop Jeremiah's arm off and he disappears into hell. Patrick goes after Jimmy, who grabs Patrick by the throat as Cynthia begs him to let go. Pearl, realizing what is happening, tells Jimmy she loves him before grabbing a candle and setting herself and the dress on fire.

As Jimmy and Pearl both die together, Patrick and Cynthia escape, barely making it out before the entire building collapses. Before jumping to safety, Cynthia is briefly pulled back into the building by an unseen force. Outside, Patrick finds an old picture of Jimmy and Pearl as Jimmy's face turns to him and says, "Dog eat dog, boy."  Too late, Patrick realizes that Cynthia has Jimmy's blood within her, and turns around as Cynthia, now possessed by Jimmy, smiles at him and vomits a mouthful of maggots into his face.

Cast

Soundtrack

Bones (soundtrack)
The soundtrack to the film was released on October 9, 2001 on Doggystyle Records and Priority Records. It peaked at #39 on the Billboard 200, #14 on the Top R&B/Hip-Hop Albums chart and #4 on the Top Soundtracks chart.

Reception
Bones received generally negative reviews and has a 25% rating on Rotten Tomatoes, based on 71 reviews, with an average rating of 3.9/10. The critical consensus reads, "Slow to start, the sleek looking Bones is more silly than scary." On Metacritic, the film has a weighted average score of 42 out of 100, based on 21 critics, indicating "mixed or average reviews". Audiences polled by CinemaScore gave the film an average grade of "C+" on an A+ to F scale.

Spence D. of IGN commended Dickerson's direction and Snoop's performance but felt the film overall cribbed too heavily from A Nightmare on Elm Street, The Omen and the Amityville Horror films for a script that fails at social commentary and tonal consistency, concluding that "Injecting humor into a horror picture is one thing, but when the horror and the comedy become indistinguishable that's when you know you're in trouble." Mike Clark of USA Today felt that Dickerson's talents were wasted in directing this "wannabe chiller" and was only brought in to fulfill a studio mandate for Halloween, concluding that, "[I]f grossness gives you the giggles, at least a couple of the movie's effects indeed put a little "wow" in this cinematic bowwow." Mick LaSalle of the San Francisco Chronicle criticized the film for being "ill conceived" with its plot structure and not focusing more on Snoop's character and his revenge tale.

Entertainment Weeklys Owen Gleiberman gave the movie a "B" grade, saying it "may be pure trash, but it's trash made with the kind of oozy psychedelic zest" found in A Nightmare on Elm Street 3: Dream Warriors. Stephen Holden of The New York Times praised Snoop's portrayal of the title character, saying he's "ultimately scarier than most conventional Hollywood monsters", and Dickerson for infusing the film with "a special glee and an unusual density of scary imagery."

Ed Gonzalez of Slant Magazine noted how the film's cinematography and horror images borrowed elements from Dario Argento's Suspiria, concluding that "[T]he film's decapitated-head-aplenty finale is ludicrously overwrought, but who cares when a socially conscious horror flick gives death such a fabulous mac daddy face?" The Austin Chronicles Marc Savlov gave praise to Snoop as the titular character for showcasing his potential as an actor and Dickerson for utilizing horror tropes to great effect, saying "If you can put aside your love of logic and sense and just go with the spookshow flow of Dickerson's funky little flick, you'll love it."

The film opened at number 10 at the U.S. box office, earning $2,823,548 in 847 theaters its opening weekend averaging $3,333 per theater. It ended up earning $7,316,658 domestically and $1,062,195 internationally for a total of $8,378,853, falling short of its $16 million budget.

Since its release, the movie enjoyed a cult following. Katana Dumont from Yahoo said:“ Despite the reviews, Bones has garnered a cult following since its initial release, and it’s not hard to see why. It has the makings of a great horror classic—gore(✅), violence(✅), sympathetic villain (✅), social parable (✅), dark plot (✅), comical scenes (✅), and decent acting (✅). All in all, Bones is a must-see for anyone who enjoys “so-bad-they’re-good movies”—even though Bones isn’t even that bad.“

Alan Dorich from CBR.com said:“Snoop [Dogg] played the titular role in the supernatural revenge film, but unfortunately, it was not a box office or critical success on release. However, over the years, Bones has gained a fan base, which deserves to be much bigger. The film, which is enjoyably campy and gory, also has moments of true creepiness, thanks to the work of Snoop and director Ernest Dickerson, who also helmed the horror-favorite Demon Knight.

Tom Moore from Collider said:“Ernest Dickerson’s Bones should be seen by every fan of the horror genre as it embodies everything fans love about the genre.

Bones features a great story that carries some strong themes and depictions of drugs and corruption decimating the Black community as well as some amazing practical effects that pay homage to various sub-genres of horror. It’s a true cult classic that shows some great direction from Dickerson and can’t miss performances from Snoop Dogg and Pam Grier.

See also
J. D.'s Revenge

References

External links

African-American horror movies

2001 films
2001 horror films
2000s hip hop films
African-American films
African-American horror films
American ghost films
American films about revenge
American haunted house films
American supernatural horror films
Blaxploitation films
Films about African-American organized crime
Films about drugs
Films about psychic powers
Films directed by Ernest Dickerson
Films scored by Elia Cmíral
Films set in the 1970s
Films shot in Vancouver
Hood films
2000s English-language films
2000s American films